Norman H. Meldrum (October 11, 1841 – February 11, 1920) was the fifth Lieutenant Governor of Colorado, serving from 1887 to 1889 under Alva Adams. He had previously served in the American Civil War guarding the construction of the Union Pacific Railroad. He also was the Secretary of State of Colorado from 1879 to 1883. As lieutenant governor Meldrum introduced the legislation for the founding of Colorado State University. He was born in Caledonia, New York and died in Denver, Colorado.

References

Lieutenant Governors of Colorado
Secretaries of State of Colorado
1841 births
1920 deaths
People from Caledonia, New York